The Robinson Baronetcy, of Toronto in Canada, was created in the Baronetage of the United Kingdom on 21 September 1854 for the Canadian lawyer and politician John Robinson.

Background
The 1st baronet was a descendant of Christopher Robinson, originally of Cleasby, Yorkshire. Christopher Robinson emigrated to Virginia in 1670; he was the elder brother of The Right Reverend John Robinson, Bishop of Bristol and Bishop of London.

Robinson baronets, of Toronto (1854)

Sir John Beverley Robinson, 1st Baronet (1791–1863)
Sir James Lukin Robinson, 2nd Baronet (1818–1894)
Sir Frederick Arnold Robinson, 3rd Baronet (1855–1901)
Sir John Beverley Beverley Robinson, 4th Baronet (1848–1933)
Sir John Beverley Robinson, 5th Baronet (1895–1948)
Sir John Beverley Robinson, 6th Baronet (1885–1954)
Sir John Beverley Robinson, 7th Baronet (1913–1988)
Christopher Philipse Robinson, presumed 8th Baronet (born 1938).  he has not successfully proven his succession and is therefore not on the Official Roll of the Baronetage, with the baronetcy considered dormant since 1988.

The presumed heir apparent to the baronetcy is Peter Duncan Robinson (born 1967), eldest surviving son of the presumed 8th baronet.

Extended family
Sir Charles Walker Robinson (1836–1924), fourth son of the first Baronet, was a Major-General in the Canadian Army.

See also
 Robinson baronets

Notes

Baronetcies in the Baronetage of the United Kingdom
1854 establishments in the United Kingdom